John Gardiner (born June 1936) is a British businessman, chairman of Tesco from 1997 to 2004.

On his retirement in March 2004, Gardiner was succeeded as chairman of Tesco by Sir David Reid, who had been deputy chairman since 1996.

References

1936 births
Chairmen of Tesco
Living people